The Cleghorn Lakes Wilderness is a  wilderness area in the southern Mojave Desert. It is managed by the Bureau of Land Management.

Named for the dry lakes found at the center of the wilderness area, this area has a variety of natural resources. The east portion is mountainous while the west portion is a vast alluvial fan and bajada.

Natural history
Wildlife includes Desert bighorn sheep on the slopes, and desert tortoise in the valley floor and bajada habitats.

Native plants include: Barrel cactus, and Smoke trees (Psorothamnus spinosus)" in some bajadas. The Cleghorn Lakes offer occasional spring wildflower displays. The  Crucifixion Thorn (Castela emoryi) shrub has been found near the eastern edge of the wilderness boundary. It is native to California, Arizona, and Sonora state in Mexico. It listed by the California Native Plant Society as rare in California, but is more common elsewhere in the lower Sonoran Deserts.

See also

References

External links
Bureau of Land Management−BLM: official Cleghorn Lakes Wilderness website

Wilderness areas of California
Protected areas of the Mojave Desert
Protected areas of San Bernardino County, California
Bureau of Land Management areas in California